Living Black! is a live album by organist Charles Earland which was recorded in New Jersey 1970 and released on the Prestige label.

Reception

Allmusic awarded the album 5 stars stating "Living Black! is notable for many reasons, not the least of which is that it showcased Earland in a live setting at his most inspired. From choosing his sidemen to material to reading the audience to pure instrumental execution, there isn't a weak moment on this date, nor a sedentary one... Everybody who was there, no doubt -- as well as any listener with blood instead of sawdust in her or his veins -- had their minds blown long before".

Track listing 
All compositions by Charles Earland except as indicated
 "Key Club Cookout" - 9:31     
 "Westbound No. 9" (Daphne Dumas, Ronald Dunbar, Edith Wayne) - 8:19     
 "Killer Joe" (Benny Golson) - 14:28     
 "Milestones" (Miles Davis) - 4:34     
 "More Today Than Yesterday" (Pat Upton) - 8:20 Bonus track on CD reissue
 "Message from a Black Man" (Barrett Strong, Norman Whitfield) - 9:59 Bonus track on CD reissue

Personnel 
Charles Earland - organ
Gary Chandler - trumpet
Grover Washington Jr. - tenor saxophone
Maynard Parker - guitar
Jesse Kilpatrick - drums
Buddy Caldwell - congas

References 

Charles Earland live albums
1971 live albums
Prestige Records live albums
Albums produced by Bob Porter (record producer)